Hsuan Hua (April 16, 1918 – June 7, 1995), also known as An Tzu, Tu Lun and Master Hua by his Western disciples, was a Chinese monk of Chan Buddhism and a contributing figure in bringing Chinese Buddhism to the United States in the late 20th century.

Hsuan Hua founded several institutions in the US. The Dharma Realm Buddhist Association (DRBA) is a Buddhist organization with chapters in North America, Australia and Asia. The City of Ten Thousand Buddhas (CTTB) in Ukiah, California, is one of the first Chan Buddhist monasteries in America. Hsuan Hua founded Dharma Realm Buddhist University at CTTB. The Buddhist Text Translation Society works on the phonetics and translation of Buddhist scriptures from Chinese into English, Vietnamese, Spanish, and many other languages.

Early life
Hsuan Hua, a native of Shuangcheng County of Jilin (now Wuchang, Harbin, Heilongjiang), was born Bai Yushu on  April 16, 1918. His parents were devout Buddhists. At an early age, Hua became a vegetarian like his mother, and decided to become a Buddhist monk.

At the age of 15, he took refuge in the Three Jewels under Chang Zhi. That same year he began to attend school and studied texts of various Chinese schools of thought, and the fields of medicine, astrology, and physiology. At 19 years of age, Hua became a monastic, under the Dharma name An Tzu.

Bringing Chinese Buddhism to the United States
In 1959, Hsuan Hua sought to bring Chinese Buddhism to the West. He instructed his disciples in America to establish a Buddhist association, initially known as The Buddhist Lecture Hall, which was renamed the Sino-American Buddhist Association before taking its present name: the Dharma Realm Buddhist Association.

Hsuan Hua traveled to Australia in 1961 and taught there for one year, returning to Hong Kong in 1962. That same year, at the invitation of American Buddhists, he traveled to the United States; his intent was to "come to America to create Patriarchs, to create Buddhas, to create Bodhisattvas".

San Francisco
Hsuan Hua resided in San Francisco, where he built a lecture hall. Hsuan Hua began to attract young Americans who were interested in meditation. He conducted daily meditation sessions and frequent Sutra lectures.

At that time, the Cuban Missile Crisis occurred between the United States and the Soviet Union, and Hsuan Hua embarked on a fasting period for thirty-five days to pray for an end to the hostilities and for world peace. In 1967, Hsuan Hua moved the Buddhist Lecture Hall back to Chinatown, locating it in the Tianhou Temple.

First American Sangha
In 1968, Hsuan Hua held a Shurangama Study and Practice Summer Session. Over thirty students from the University of Washington in Seattle came to study the Buddha's teachings. After the session was concluded, five young Americans (Bhikṣu Heng Chyan, Heng Jing, and Heng Shou, and Bhikṣuṇīs Heng Yin and Heng Ch'ih) requested permission to take full ordination.

Hsuan Hua lectured on the entire  in 1968 while he was in the United States. These lectures were recorded in an eight-part series of books containing the sutra and a traditionally rigorous form of commentary that addresses each passage. It was again lectured by the original translator monks and nuns of the City of Ten Thousand Buddhas at Dharma Realm Buddhist University in the summer of 2003.

Vision of American Buddhism
With the founding of his American Sangha, Hsuan Hua embarked on his personal vision for Buddhism in the United States:
 Bringing the true and proper teachings of the Buddha to the West and establishing a proper monastic community of the fully ordained Sangha there
 Organizing and supporting the translation of the entire Buddhist canon into English and other Western languages
 Promoting wholesome education through the establishment of schools and universities

Hosting ordination ceremonies
Because of the increasing numbers of people who wished to become monks and nuns under Hsuan Hua's guidance, in 1972 he decided to hold ordination ceremonies at Gold Mountain Dhyana Monastery. Two monks and one nun received ordination. Subsequent ordination platforms have been held at the City of Ten Thousand Buddhas in 1976, 1979, 1982, 1989, 1991, and 1992, and progressively larger numbers of people have received full ordination. Over two hundred people from countries all over the world were ordained under him.

Theravada and Mahayana traditions
Having traveled to Thailand and Burma in his youth to investigate the Southern Tradition of Buddhism, Hsuan Hua wanted to bridge what he perceived as a rift between the Northern (Mahayana) and Southern (Theravada) traditions. In an address to Ajahn Sumedho and the monastic community at Amaravati Buddhist Monastery on October 6, 1990, Hsuan Hua stated:

On the occasion of the opening ceremony for the Dharma Realm Buddhist University, Hsuan Hua presented K. Sri Dhammananda of the Theravada tradition with an honorary Ph.D. He also donated a major piece of the land that would become Abhayagiri Buddhist Monastery, a Theravada Buddhist monastery in the Thai Forest tradition of Ajahn Chah, located in Redwood Valley, California.

Hsuan Hua would also invite Bhikkhus from both traditions to jointly conduct the High Ordination.

Chinese and American Buddhism
From July 18 to the 24th of 1987, Hsuan Hua hosted the Water, Land, and Air Repentance Dharma Assembly, a centuries-old ritual often seen as the "king of dharma services" in Chinese Buddhism, at the City of Ten Thousand Buddhas and invited over seventy Buddhists from mainland China to attend. This was the first time the service was known to have been held in North America.

On November 6, 1990, Hsuan Hua sent his disciples to Beijing to bring the Dragon Treasury edition of the Chinese Buddhist canon back to CTTB, furthering his goal of bringing Buddhism to the US.

Death

On June 7, 1995, while visiting Long Beach Sagely Monastery, Hsuan Hua died in his sleep. He had been ill for some time prior to his death at the age of 77.

Funeral
Hsuan Hua's funeral lasted from June 8 to July 29. On June 17, Hsuan Hua's body was placed in a refrigerated casket and taken from southern to northern California, returning to the City of Ten Thousand Buddhas to lie in repose. All major services during the funeral were presided over by Ming Yang, abbot of Longhua Temple in Shanghai and a longtime friend of Hsuan Hua's.

On July 28, monks from both Theravada and Mahayana traditions hosted a memorial ceremony and cremation.  More than two thousand followers from the United States, Canada, and various Asian and European countries, came to CTTB to take part in the funeral service. Letters of condolences from dignitaries including former President George H. W. Bush were read during the service.

A day after the cremation, July 29, Hsuan Hua's ashes were scattered, at his request, in the open air above the City of Ten Thousand Buddhas from a hot air balloon by his first two disciples, Heng Sure and Heng Chau. After the funeral, memorial services commemorating Hsuan Hua's life were held in various parts of the world, including Taiwan, China, and Canada. His śarīra (relics) were then distributed to many of his temples, disciples, and followers.

See also
Buddhism in the United States
Timeline of Zen Buddhism in the United States
Buddhism in the West

References

External links
Tripitaka Master Hsuan Hua

1918 births
1995 deaths
American Buddhists
American Zen Buddhists
Chan Buddhist monks
Dharma Realm Buddhist Association
Chinese Zen Buddhists
Hong Kong Zen Buddhists
Republic of China Buddhist monks
Zen Buddhist spiritual teachers
Zen Buddhism writers
20th-century Chinese people
Writers from Harbin
Chinese spiritual writers
Hong Kong Buddhist monks
20th-century Buddhist monks